Enterprise is a former mining camp in Amador County, California. Established to mine quartz, at its peak it had a population of around a hundred, but the prospects did not pan out, and there are only a few houses in the area now.

References

Unincorporated communities in California
Unincorporated communities in Amador County, California